Neil Harvey Arasmith (February 23, 1930–September 26, 2010) was an American politician who served as a Republican in the Kansas State Senate from 1973 to 1989.

Early life and education
He received a bachelor of arts from the University of Kansas in 1951. He served in the U.S. Air Force and was a second lieutenant. After serving in the air force, he then worked for Mason Investment Company in Salina.

References

1930 births
2010 deaths
Republican Party Kansas state senators
20th-century American politicians
United States Air Force officers
Kansas State University alumni